14-18, the musical is a Flemish musical about the First World War with the music of Dirk Brossé. The original production by Gert Verhulst and Hans Bourlon opened in April 2014 at the Nekkerhal in Mechelen, directed by Frank Van Laecke and produced by Studio 100. The show closed on November 11, 2014, after being seen by more than 320,000 visitors.

The show is about a group of Flemish friends at the outbreak of World War I, as the war drags on longer than anyone expected.

History

Development
On June 24, 2011, Studio 100 announced that the creative team of Daens was brought together to create a new spectacle about the First World War. On October 30, 2013 Studio 100 announced that there would be English language shows with an alternate cast. On April 15, 2014, it was announced that 117,000 tickets were sold. On June 12, 2014, Studio 100 announced that more than 200,000 tickets were sold.

Platform
The musical played in the Nekkerhal in Mechelen. In this gigantic hall, it was possible to build a mobile platform so the audience could ride for 150 meters on a set that had a surface area of 2 football fields. The platform weighed 135 tons (excluding the audience), rode over 350 wheels, and was 55 meters long and 22 meters wide.

Scenery
There were 11 gigantic setpieces (including 6 houses and a large tree) that moved using laser-guided technology. The cast consisted of 9 main actors, 23 ensemble members, 45 extras, 16 children and 6 horse riders.

Story
In 1914, Germany wants to attack France via Belgium. Belgium refuses and becomes involved in World War I. Jan, Kamiel, Albert and Fons are friends who have to fight to defend their country. But all of them want to be somewhere else: Jan wants to go home to his wife, who is pregnant with his son, Kamiel hates violence and does everything to escape it, Albert wants to return to his sweethearts.

Cast
 Jan: Jelle Cleymans
 Albert: Bert Verbeke
 Fons: Jonas Van Geel
 Kamiel: Lander Depoortere
 Céline: Maaike Cafmeyer
 Anna: Free Souffriau
 General: Jo de Meyere
 Sergeant Dedecker: 
 Deprez: Louis Talpe

The role of the general was alternated from September 5, 2014 between Jo De Meyere and Mike Verdrengh. On September 17, 2014, Maaike Cafmeyer was replaced by Marie Vinck. On October 1, Bert Verbeke, who took on the role of Albert, was replaced by James Cooke.

English cast
 Jan: Rob Eyles
 Albert: Bert Verbeke (BE)
 Fons: Danny Whitehead
 Kamiel: Jonathan Broderick
 Celine: Sarah Dungworth
 Anna: Kayleigh McKnight
 General: Dirk Bosschaert (BE)
 Sergeant Dedecker: Luke Hope
 Deprez: Lawrence Sheldon
Source:

References

External links

  
  

2014 musicals